Vădeni is a commune in Soroca District, Moldova. It is composed of two villages, Dumbrăveni and Vădeni.

References

Communes of Soroca District